Sutton County is a county located on the Edwards Plateau in the U.S. state of Texas. As of the 2020 census, the population was 3,372. Its county seat is Sonora. The county was created in 1887 and organized in 1890. Sutton County is named for John S. Sutton, an officer in the Confederate Army.

History

 9500 BC – c. 1860s AD Paleo-Indians in the county leave behind archaeological remains of a burned-rock midden with mortar and pestle, as well as other tools. Later native inhabitants include Tonkawa, Comanche and Lipan Apache.
 1736 Lt. Miguel de la Garza Falcón leads 100 soldiers along the Devils River
 1852, February 2 - Camp Terrett, later known as Fort Terrett, established to protect settlers from Comanches.  Founded by Lt. Col. Henry Bainbridge and named for Lt. John Terrett, who was killed in the Battle of Monterrey in 1846.
 1881 Wall's Well discovered by Tim Birtrong and Ed Wall. Town of Wentworth discovered. Birtrong Ranch is the area's only ranch.
 1885 Charles G. Adams, a merchant and sometime rancher from Fort McKavett, founds Sonora, Texas, named after a family servant from Sonora, Mexico.
 1887 The Texas legislature establishes Sutton County, carved out of eastern Crockett County named for Confederate officer John Schuyler Sutton.
 1890 Sonora becomes the county seat.
 1915 Texas Sheep & Goat Raisers’ Association organized.
 1928 The Atchison, Topeka and Santa Fe Railway acquires Kansas City, Mexico and Orient Railway to connect Sonora with San Angelo, Del Rio, and the outside world by rail.
 1930 Sonora Wool and Mohair Company established.
 1936 WPA projects help local economy.
 1958, August 1 – Sonora Municipal Airport activated.
 1960, July 16 – Caverns of Sonora open to the public.
 1965 Caverns of Sonora designated National Natural Landmark.
 1975 Fort Terrett Ranch is purchased by the Texas oil industrialist Bill Noël and used in part for the growing of pecans.

Geography

Major highways
  Interstate 10
  U.S. Highway 277

Adjacent counties
 Schleicher County (north)
 Kimble County (east)
 Edwards County (south)
 Val Verde County (southwest)
 Crockett County (west)
 Menard County (northeast)

Demographics

Note: the US Census treats Hispanic/Latino as an ethnic category. This table excludes Latinos from the racial categories and assigns them to a separate category. Hispanics/Latinos can be of any race.

As of the census of 2000, there were 4,077 people, 1,515 households, and 1,145 families residing in the county.  The population density was 3 people per square mile (1/km2).  There were 1,998 housing units at an average density of 1 per square mile (1/km2).  The racial makeup of the county was 45.28% White, 0.25% Black or African American, 0.42% Native American, 0.17% Asian, 2.27% from other races, and 1.62% from two or more races.  49.99% of the population were Hispanic or Latino of any race.

There were 1,515 households, out of which 38.20% had children under the age of 18 living with them, 63.60% were married couples living together, 7.70% had a female householder with no husband present, and 24.40% were non-families. 22.60% of all households were made up of individuals, and 9.60% had someone living alone who was 65 years of age or older.  The average household size was 2.67 and the average family size was 3.15.

In the county, the population was spread out, with 28.80% under the age of 18, 6.70% from 18 to 24, 27.70% from 25 to 44, 24.40% from 45 to 64, and 12.50% who were 65 years of age or older.  The median age was 36 years. For every 100 females there were 99.50 males.  For every 100 females age 18 and over, there were 96.00 males.

The median income for a household in the county was $34,385, and the median income for a family was $38,143. Males had a median income of $31,193 versus $18,587 for females. The per capita income for the county was $17,105.  About 14.10% of families and 18.00% of the population were below the poverty line, including 25.20% of those under age 18 and 16.10% of those age 65 or over.

Education

Sutton County is served by the Sonora Independent School District based in Sonora.

Communities

City
 Sonora (county seat)

Ghost Towns
 Fort Terrett
 Owenville
 Wentworth

Politics
Sutton County is very conservative in national politics. In 2016, it gave 76% of its vote to Republican candidate Donald Trump. It last supported a Democrat in 1964, when Texan Lyndon B. Johnson was the Democratic candidate. However, this was not always the case. In fact, in 1916, the Democratic candidate received 10 times as many votes as the Republican. It hasn't supported a Democrat in Texas gubernatorial elections since 1974, when Dolph Briscoe, the Democrat, carried all but five counties in the state.

See also

 List of museums in Central Texas
 National Register of Historic Places listings in Sutton County, Texas
 Recorded Texas Historic Landmarks in Sutton County

References

External links

 Sutton County government's website
 
 Sutton County Profile from the Texas Association of Counties

 
1890 establishments in Texas
Populated places established in 1890
Texas Hill Country
Majority-minority counties in Texas